The École nationale supérieure des technologies et industries du bois (ENSTIB, formerly ESSTIB) is a French engineering College created in 1985.

The school's teaching is based on the needs of the wood sector, drawing on research. Four sectors of activity are favored within the school:

 Construction — design ;
 Energy and environment ;
 Production and logistics ;
 Fibrous materials.

Located in Épinal, the ENSTIB is a public higher education institution. The school is a member of the University of Lorraine and the National Polytechnic Institute of Lorraine.

Notable alumni 
 Jean-Luc Sandoz, a French-Swiss engineer and an expert in wood construction

References

External links
 ENSTIB

Engineering universities and colleges in France
ENSTIB
Épinal
Educational institutions established in 1985
1985 establishments in France